Disonycha tenuicornis is a species of flea beetle in the family Chrysomelidae. It is found in Central America and North America.

References

Further reading

 
 

Alticini
Articles created by Qbugbot
Beetles described in 1889
Beetles of Central America
Beetles of North America